Annie Cohen-Solal is a French historian and writer. Her work investigates the interactions between art, literature and society, including intercultural aspects. After Sartre : A Life (1987) became an international success, she was the French cultural counselor in the US from 1989 to 1992. Working in the disciplinary fields of social and artistic history, she focuses on the agents responsible for modern symbolic circulations.

Life
Born in Algiers, Cohen-Solal settled and lived in seven different countries and speaks seven languages.

As an academic, she held positions at the Freie Universität Berlin, Hebrew University of Jerusalem, Tisch School of Art (NYU), École des Hautes Études en Sciences Sociales, University of Caen (Basse-Normandie), École Normale supérieure in Paris.

Since her earliest projects as a scholar, she has been borrowing techniques from ethnography and anthropology, combining them with traditional historical archival research in intercultural contexts. After her PhD Paul Nizan communiste impossible, 1980, she was commissioned by André Schiffrin (Pantheon Books, New York) to write the  first biography of Jean-Paul Sartre. Published in 1985, this book was translated into sixteen languages, which until today, some describe as "unsurpassable".

As Cultural Counselor to the French Embassy in the United States in residence in New York (1989-1993), Cohen-Solal tackled numerous fields, managed to get Ariane Mnouchkine's Les Atrides to BAM, and created the first French interdisciplinary academic program across the US "centres d'excellence".

In New York, Cohen-Solal's first encounter with Leo Castelli led her to shift her interest from intellectuals to agents of the art world. In the frame of a manyfold project which was to become a social history of the US artist, she published Painting American (2001) and Leo & His Circle : The Life of Leo Castelli (2010).  She also published New York-Mid Century (2014), with Paul Goldberger and Robert Gottlieb; and Mark Rothko : Toward the Light in the Chapel (2014). By adopting the historical perspective of the longue durée and developing a multiscalar analysis of configurations, Cohen-Solal highlighted the various networks of agents who made possible the empowerment of the artist in the US as well as the shift of the art world to the US. In 2001, she produced a 25 programs-series for France-Culture: From Frederic Church to Jackson Pollock, the Heroic March of American Painters.

In 2014, she became general curator of Magiciens de la terre 2014 at the Centre Pompidou, and published Magiciens de la terre : retour sur une exposition légendaire, with Jean-Hubert Martin.

As part of her work on art, artists, intellectual and social circulations, she was commissioned by Leon Black (Jewish Lives series at Yale University Press) to write Mark Rothko : toward the Light in the Chapel, translated into six languages.  Following the social and geographical trajectory of the painter, her book reveals how this Jewish child who immigrated to the United States at age ten, became a true agent of transformation of the country, managing to integrate the different cultural areas to which he belonged, notably in the Rothko Chapel (Houston, Texas) commissioned by the de Menil family and inaugurated in 1971. Following her global vision of artistic flows, the Maeght Foundation in Saint Paul de Vence entrusted her with the essay  for Christo and Jeanne-Claude : Barrels (2016). With historian Jeremy Adelman (Princeton University), she became co-director of "Crossing Boundaries", a research group at CASBS (Center for Advanced Behavioral Studies), Stanford University (2015).

On the occasion of Sartre's centenary in 2005, her international lecture tour took her to Brazil, where she and Gilberto Gil considered the creation of a Sartre Chair at the University of Brasilia. She then co-directed the organization of the Sartre Night at the ENS, involving students and researchers as philosophers, historians and geographers, and led a research seminar "Geopolitics of Sartre" (2013). In 2009, at the French Consulate in New York, she was presented with the title of Chevalier dans l'ordre national de la Légion d'Honneur , the highest decoration in France, by Ambassador Pierre Vimont. Annie Cohen-Solal is a trustee of Paris College of Art (since 2015). She joined the jury of the Latvian Architecture Award in Riga (2015) and that of the Evens Art Prize in Antwerp (2016).

As a curator, she has been curating an exhibition « Picasso l'étranger » for the Musée national de l'Histoire de l'Immigration de la Porte Dorée, in partnership with the Musée national Picasso-Paris, which was presented from October 12, 2021 to February 13, 2022. Her last essay, Picasso the foreigner (Prix Femina essai, Fayard, Paris, 2021), will be published in March 2023 by both Farrar, Straus & Giroux and Ediciones Paidós.

Bibliography
 Paul Nizan, communiste impossible, Paris, Grasset, 1980.
 Sartre: A Life, Translated by Anna Cancongi, Pantheon Books, 1988, ; Translated Norman MacAfee, New Press, 2005, (translated in sixteen languages).
 Jean-Paul Sartre, Paris, Gallimard, 1991, album "La Pléiade".
 Sartre 1905-1980, Paris, Gallimard, 1999, coll. "Folio-Essais".
 Painting American: The Rise of American Artists, Paris 1867-New York 1948, Translated Laurie Hurwitz-Attias, Alfred A. Knopf, 2001.
 Jean-Paul Sartre, Paris, PUF, 2005, coll. "Que sais-je ?", nº 3732. (translated into Japanese, Turkish, Arabic, Spanish, Portuguese).
 Sartre, un penseur pour le XXIe siècle, Paris, Gallimard, 2005, coll. « Découvertes Gallimard / Littératures » (nº 468).
 New York Mid-Century (with Paul Goldberger and Robert Gottlieb), New York, Vendome Press, 2014 (translated in English and German).
 Leo and His Circle. Alfred A. Knopf, 2010 (translated in French, Italian, Dutch, Spanish, Turkish, Chinese).
 Une Renaissance sartrienne, Paris, Gallimard, 2013, (translated in Spanish and Italian).
 Magiciens de la terre : retour sur une exposition légendaire (avec Jean-Hubert Martin), Xavier Barral et Centre Pompidou. 
Calder/Prouvé, New York, Gagosian Gallery, 2014 (in French, English and Italian). 
 Mark Rothko: Toward the Light in the Chapel. Yale UP, collection Jewish Lives. 2015. pp. 4–. .
 « In Quest of The Mastaba », in : Christo et Jeanne-Claude : Barils/Barrels, Fondation Maeght, 2016.
 La valeur de l'art contemporain, collection La vie des idées, (with Cristelle Teroni) PUF, 2016. 
Calder, Forgeron de géantes libellules, Paris, Gallimard et Musée Soulages, 2017.

Various contributions 

 Séjour d'études « Picasso l'étranger » , July 2020, Fondation des Treilles
 Artists in Time of Crisis : On Christo, Sartre, Rothko and Calder, 92Y, June 2020  
 « Around the Rothko Chapel », an international symposium, Fondation des Treilles, July 2019 
 « Artistes et déracinement : le cas de Mark Rothko » ; in Migrations, réfugiés, exil, (sous la direction de Patrick Boucheron), Paris, Odile Jacob, 2017 
 "Juifs et Musulmans français dans l'oeil Américain" in Libération, 15/02/2016.
 "Tracing Rothko's Vision Throughout the World : A Rothko Blog" in Libération, 2015
 « Revisiting Magicians of the Earth » in Collecting Geographies,  Stedelijks Museum, Amsterdam, 2014.
"The multiples territories of Cy Twombly" in Eykyn   Twombly. Works from the Sonnabend Collection, London : Cy Twombly Foundation, 2012.  
 "Sartre Reconsidered in Light of the Obama Era", keynote address, 17th Conference of the North American Sartre Society, University of Memphis, Memphis, Tennessee, 21-23 novembre 2009
 "Simone de Beauvoir and 'The Wonders of America': 1947-1951", p. 79-95, in: Simone de Beauvoir. Centennial Conference, volume X, The Florence Gould Lectures at New York University, Center for Civilization and Culture, New York University, New York, Summer 2009
"To Ileana, from Bob : rauschenberg drawings from the sonnabend collection", Craig F. Starr Gallery, 2009.
 "Parisian Metamorphosis in Four Acts", p. 220-225, in : Alexander Calder, the Paris Years 1926-1933, catalogue d'exposition, Whitney Museum of American Art et Centre Pompidou, Paris, 2008 
 "The Ultimate Challenge for Alfred H. Barr, Jr. : Transforming the Ecology of American Culture, 1924–1943", p.196-214, in : Abstract Expressionism in Context, Joan Marter editor, New Brunswick, Rutgers University Press, 2007
 « Sartre at His Centennial : Errant Master or Moral Compass? », p. 223-230, in : Theory and Society, Kluwer, Boston, 2007 
 "Existentialism Is a Humanism", p. 3-15, Préface to the English version of  "Explication de L'Etranger" et "L'Existentialisme est un humanisme", New Haven, YUP, 2007
 « Sartre and the United States: A Series of Adventures in America », Journal of Romance Studies, Oxford, 2006
 « Planting the Seeds of Modernism in the United States », p. 173-185, in : Partisan Review, vol. LXVIII, n° 2, William Phillips, éditeur, Boston, Boston University, Spring 2002.
 « An Affair to Remember", New York Times, July 14, 2002.
 « 'Claude L. Strauss' in the United States », in : Partisan Review, vol. LXVII, n° 2, William Phillips, éditeur, Boston, Boston University, Spring 2000. 
 « Between Sartre and Camus, the Algerian War », in : Journal of European Studies, vol. XXVIII, Richard J. Golsan, editor, Bucks, Alpha Academic, 1998.
 « Coal Miners and Dinosaurs », p. 125-136, in : Media Studies Journal, special issue : « Global Views on U.S Media », New York, The Freedom Forum Media Studies Center, New York, Columbia University, Fall 1995.
 « France and the Fear of the New Germany : A view from France », Partisan Review, October 1995.
 « Culture and the French Nation », p. 161-167, in : Culture and Democracy: Social and Ethical Issues in Public Support of the Arts and Humanities, Andrew Buchwalter, editor, Boulder, Colorado, Westview Press, 1992.
 « Tracking Down a Willing and Reluctant Hero », p. 86-96, in : L'Esprit Créateur, vol. XXIX, n°4, Susan R. Suleiman, editor, Cambridge, MA, Harvard University Press, 1989!;
 « Lettre d'Italie », in Lettres d'Europe, Albin Michel, Paris 1988.
 "The Young Sartre", p. 212-226, in : Partisan Review, vol. 54, n°2, William Phillips, éditeur, Boston, Boston University, été 1987
 "Simone de Beauvoir", Vogue, New York, July 1985.
 "Mode galopante d'un produit mixte", p. 133-137, in : Revue des sciences humaines, numéro spécial : « Récits de vie », tome LXII, no 191–192, Lille, Université de Lille III, 1983. 
 "Un Yéménite dans une poste" (avec Christian Bachmann), p. 80-97, in : Etudes de Linguistique Appliquée, n°37, André Abbou, rédacteur en chef, Paris, Didier Erudition, janvier-mars 1980.

Press

Videos and radio 

 "Sacred Spaces and Post War Arts", Webinair TEFAF, Apollo Magazine, November 2020.
 "Artists in Time of Crisis : Remembering Christo", 92nd Street Y, June 2020.
 Reading on Leo & His Circle, at Christie's, New York.
 Lecture on Sartre, Cornell University. 
 Lectures and Interviews for France Culture. 
 Exploring Mark Rothko with Annie Cohen-Solal, in conversation with Peter Selz for Stanford Institute for Creativity and the Arts (SiCa).
 Midday with Dan Rodricks. 
 Leo Castelli: A Global Gallerist Anchored in Renaissance Italy. October 25, 2010.
 Interviews with Bernard Pivot for Apostrophes.
 "The Life and Influence of Leo Castelli" (interview with Leonard Lopate, August 13, 2010).

Press excerpts 

"A Very Wily Believer", The New York Review of Books, 01/13/2011.
"A Smooth Operator", by Dwight Garner, The New York Times, 05/18/2010.
"Leo the Lion, How the Castelli gallery changed the art world", The New Yorker, 06/07/2010.
"From Trieste to New York. Annie Cohen-Solal's Leo & His Circle" Primo Levi Center, 01/26/2010.
"Leo and His Circle", Christian Science Monitor, 07/02/2010.
"Leo & His Circle: The Life of Leo Castelli", Society of Contemporary Artists, 06/14/2010.
"Ten Juicy Tales from the New Leo Castelli Biography"Art Info, 06/04/2010.
"Leo and his Circle: The Life of Leo Castelli", Miami Art Guide, 06/02/2010.
"How France lost art to America Writer traces the rise of New York as the world's art capital", Toronto Star, 05/28/2002.
"Planting the Seeds of Modernism. An Evening with Annie Cohen-Solal", Partisan Review Vol.  LXIX, 04/10/2002.
"Painting American: The Rise Of American Artists, Paris 1867- New York 1948", Pittsburgh Post-Gazette, 01/23/2001.
"Leo Castelli: This Charming Man", New York Observer, 05/04/2010.
"French Writer Explores Two Cultures Entwined", The New York Times, 11/22/2001.
"Pinceaux d'Amérique : des peintres pour le nouveau monde", Libération, 07/2001.

References

External links

 Personal Website
 https://artsbeat.blogs.nytimes.com/2015/03/12/with-a-big-sale-looming-a-new-view-of-rothko/?searchResultPosition=2&mtrref=www.nytimes.com&gwh=D21900D2E15F4153AA656074E29A6862&gwt=pay&assetType=REGIWALL
 https://artsbeat.blogs.nytimes.com/2015/03/12/with-a-big-sale-looming-a-new-view-of-rothko/?searchResultPosition=2&mtrref=www.nytimes.com&gwh=D21900D2E15F4153AA656074E29A6862&gwt=pay&assetType=REGIWALL 
 
http://tabletmag.com/jewish-arts-and-culture/books/189032/yale-up-mark-rothko
http://www.albany.edu/writers-inst/webpages4/archives/cohen_solal_annie10.html

Academic staff of the University of Paris
New York University faculty
Academic staff of the Hebrew University of Jerusalem
French expatriates in Israel
French expatriates in the United States
20th-century French Jews
Living people
Officiers of the Ordre des Arts et des Lettres
1948 births
Prix Femina essai winners